The Wekiva River, also known as Wekiva Creek or Wekiva Run, is a tributary of the Waccasassa River that originates at Wekiva Spring in Levy County, Florida. From Wekiva Spring the river meanders westward and then southward about 7 miles to where it flows into the Waccasassa River. It is fed along the way by Mule Creek and the Little Wekiva River. Wekiva Spring is located at Lat. 29° 16' 49.49" N, Long. 82° 39' 21.90" W. Discharge at the spring head on July 30, 1997, was 26.28 ft3/sec. The river is centrally located in the area between the Withlacoochee and Suwannee Rivers that is often referred to as the Gulf Hammock.

In 1877 Christopher Wingate and his wife Emma Wingate built the Gulf Hammock Hotel on land lying between the Wekiva and Little Wekiva Rivers. The hotel welcomed hunters, fishermen, and travelers from all over the world until 1905. One of the regular guests there was the American landscape painter Hermann Ottomar Herzog, who visited from about 1893 to 1905. Herzog painted over one hundred paintings in the Gulf Hammock area, including at least seven with the name "Wekiva" in the title.

Beginning about 1908 many areas accessible via the Wekiva and Waccasassa River area were logged for cypress. The trees were floated down to Burns Landing on the Waccasassa, then rafted downstream to the Gulf of Mexico and up the coast to a sawmill at Lukens, near Cedar Key, Florida.

See also
List of rivers of Florida
List of major springs in Florida

References 

Rivers of Florida